The Palestinian Information Center (PIC) is a Palestinian News website & Network, established first in Arabic language on 1 December 1997, later the English language was launched on 1 January 1998. Other 7 languages followed. It's one of the most viewed website in Palestine , PIC aims to promote awareness about Palestine, the Palestinians and the Palestinian issue.

According to the Israeli scholars Tomer Mozes and Gabriel Weimann, the Palestine Information Center is the leading gateway site in Hamas' online propaganda network of twenty websites. They argue that the PIC's content and news coverage is primarily oriented towards Hamas's ideology and history.

The Facebook page, which had close to 5 million followers, was taken down in October 2019, prompting protests using the hashtag #FBblocksPalestine. Its website is blocked by the Palestinian Authority in the West Bank.

Multi languages
PIC now in 9 different languages:
 Arabic (start on 1 December 1997)
 English (start on 1 January 1998)
 French language
 Russian language – (start in 2001)
 Turkish language
 Urdu- (start in 2002)
 Malay language- (start in 2001)
 Persian language
 Tamil language- (start in 2017)

External links
 
 
  (in English)
 
  (in Tamil)

References 

Arabic-language websites
French-language websites
English-language websites
Russian-language websites
Turkish-language websites
Urdu-language websites
Malay-language websites
Persian-language websites
Multilingual news services
1997 establishments in the Palestinian territories
Multilingual websites
Palestinian news websites
Internet properties established in 1997